Hands on a Hardbody may refer to:

 Hands on a Hard Body: The Documentary, 1997 film
 Hands on a Hardbody (musical), 2012 stage musical adaptation of the film